The following is a list of Teen Choice Award winners and nominees for the Choice TV Drama Series award, which was formerly known as the Choice TV Action/Drama Series award. The television series with the most wins in this category is Pretty Little Liars, with 5 wins.

Winners and nominees

1990s

2000s

2010s

References

Drama Series